Ajay Yadav (born 18 December 1986) is an Indian cricket player who  plays for Jharkhand in the Ranji Trophy, the domestic first-class cricket competition in India. He is right-hand batsman and right-arm medium-fast bowler.

Yadav has played two Twenty20 matches for Jharkhand.

Personal life 
Yadav's parents died when he was young, and he continued their family dairy business.

References

External links 

Living people
1986 births
Indian cricketers